YouTube Space Lab was a 2011–2012 international science competition launched by YouTube and Lenovo, in cooperation with NASA, European Space Agency (ESA), and the Japan Aerospace Exploration Agency (JAXA). Founded by Zahaan Bharmal of Google, the competition challenged teenagers from ages 14–18 to design an experiment to be performed on the International Space Station. The global winners were Amr Mohamed from Alexandria, Egypt, and Dorothy Chen and Sara Ma from Troy, Michigan.

Announcement and finalists 
YouTube and Lenovo announced the YouTube Space Lab competition on 10 October 2011. Applicants were challenged to design a microgravity experiment, and submissions closed in early December. On 17 January 2012, YouTube Space Lab announced sixty finalists and started the voting process for the regional winners where over 150,000 YouTube users voted for their favorite experiments. These results were factored alongside YouTube Space Lab's panel of judges, including Stephen Hawking, William Gerstenmaier, Leland Melvin, Akihiko Hoshide, Guy Laliberté, and Tshilidzi Marwala.  Stephen Hawking, however, was unable to fully participate as a judge at this stage because of health problems, and his position was filled by colleague Paul Shellard.

Regional and global winners 
Regional winners were determined by votes cast by the YouTube community factored alongside the votes cast by the competition's panel of judges. On 22 February 2012, YouTube Space Lab announced the following six regional winning teams, two from each international region:

The nine contestants gathered on March in Washington, D.C., to experience a zero-gravity flight on the "Vomit Comet" and to tour the Steven F. Udvar-Hazy Center. They attended the competition award ceremony on 22 March at the Newseum, where Zahaan Bharmal announced the two winning experiments: Dorothy Chen and Sara Ma's bacteria experiment, and Amr Mohamed's jumping spider experiment.

BioServe Space Technologies, from the University of Colorado at Boulder, designed the two experiments using global winners' ideas. Dorothy and Sara went to the Tanegashima Space Center in Japan in late July to watch the Kounotori 3 launch the winning experiments into space. Instead of attending the launch, Amr chose to later go through cosmonaut training at the Yuri Gagarin Cosmonaut Training Center in Star City, Russia.

Livestream and results 

On 13 September 2012, Bill Nye hosted a live-stream interview connecting the three global winners with astronaut Sunita Williams. Sunita, who had performed the experiments on the ISS, gave the preliminary results for these experiments. Dorothy and Sara had hypothesized that the Bacillus subtilis would become more efficient germ-fighters in microgravity, and the initial results showed signs of growth. However, the specimens would have to be taken back to Earth for further testing. Amr's experiment examined the predatory behavior of the jumping spider, and the ISS reported that Amr's spider, named Nefertiti and nicknamed Neffi, had successfully adapted to catch its prey in microgravity.

Nefertiti returned to Earth on 30 November 2012 and lived at the O. Orkin Insect Zoo in Washington, D.C., until she died four days later. Nefertiti's traveling companion, a zebra spider named Cleopatra, died soon after touchdown.

References

External links 

 Official YouTube channel
 Resources site
 YouTube Space Lab at NASA.gov
 Nefertiti, the Spidernaut, children's picture book by Darcy Pattison

2011 in science
2012 in spaceflight
International Space Station experiments
Lenovo
Youth science
YouTube